Ziegelbauer is a German surname. Notable people with this surname include the following:

 Bob Ziegelbauer (born 1951), American politician, Democratic Party member of the Wisconsin State Assembly
 Magnoald Ziegelbauer (1689–1750), German Benedictine monk and ecclesiastical historian
 Maximilian Ziegelbauer (1923–2016), German Roman Catholic theologian and former bishop

German-language surnames